The Tripura Pradesh Congress Committee (or Tripura PCC) is the unit of the Indian National Congress for the state of Tripura.

The head office of the organization is Congress Bhawan, situated in Agartala.

The president of the Tripura Congress is Birajit Sinha.

List of presidents

Tripura Legislative Assembly election

Structure and Composition

See also
 Indian National Congress
 Congress Working Committee
 All India Congress Committee
 Pradesh Congress Committee

References

External links
 

Indian National Congress by state or union territory
Politics of Tripura